The Argentina national beach soccer team represents Argentina in international beach soccer competitions and is controlled by the AFA, the governing body for football in Argentina.

The Argentina national beach soccer team has qualified and participated in eight FIFA Beach Soccer World Cup Tournaments and has been a Winner of the CONMEBOL Competition once and Runners-up twice. Argentina is ranked 10th in the FIFA World Rankings.

Current squad
''Correct as of April 2015:

Current staff
 Coach: Gustavo Casado
 Technical Assistant: Esteban Pizzi
 Head Delegation: Gustavo Lorenzo

FIFA Beach Soccer World Cup Record

Beach Soccer World Championships

Regional honours
 CONCACAF and CONMEBOL Beach Soccer Championship: 
 4th 2005
 3rd 2007
 CONMEBOL Beach Soccer Championship: 
 3rd (3) 2006, 2009 and 2015 
 Runners-up (2) 2008 and 2011
 Winners (1) 2013.

Mundialito de Futebol de Praia
 3rd (3) 2006, 2008, 2010

Copa Latina
 2nd (1) 2006
 3rd (4) 1999, 2003, 2009, 2010

References

External links
 World Cup 08 team page

South American national beach soccer teams
Beach Soccer